General Bragg may refer to:

Braxton Bragg (1817–1876), General in the Confederate States Army during the American Civil War
Edward S. Bragg (1827–1912), Union Army brigadier general
Philip Bragg (died 1759), Irish lieutenant general
USS General Bragg (1851), a warship that was pressed into service by the Confederate Navy during the American civil war